Far Eastern University – Dr. Nicanor Reyes Medical Foundation, also referred to as FEU-NRMF, is a non-stock, non-profit medical foundation located at Regalado Ave., West Fairview, Quezon City in the Philippines. It operates a medical school and hospital center. The institution is related to, but independent from, Far Eastern University.

Brief history

Upon the establishment and incorporation of the Far Eastern University in 1934, it has always been a part of FEU founder Dr. Nicanor Reyes Sr.'s vision to set up a medical school alongside the university. This vision finally materialized years after his passing.

Establishment as an Institute 
In 1952, the Board of Trustees, under the chairmanship of Don Jose Cojuangco, commissioned a Medical School Committee to recruit faculty members and establish the institute. Faculties were contacted and equipment and facilities were readied. By June, the Far Eastern University Institute of Medicine (IM) formally opened its doors to its first students. The IM settled in the third to seventh floors of the Science Building within the campus. Headed by its committee members, Dr. Lauro H. Panganiban was installed as the first Institute Dean.

The Institute's courses were handled by luminaries in Philippine medical education, with Dr. Liborio Gomez in Pathology, Bacteriology, Parasitology and Laboratory Diagnosis; Dr. Daniel de la Paz in Pharmacology; Dr. Perfecto Gutierrez in Medicine; Dr. Gloria T. Aragon in Obstetrics and Gynecology; Dr. Carlos Sevilla in Ophthalmology and Otorhinolaryngology; Dr. Fe Del Mundo in Pediatrics; Dr. Tomas M. Gan in Hygiene, Preventive Medicine and Biostatistics; and Dr. Ricardo L. Alfonso in Surgery. Through the years, the departments and the courses of instruction were shaped by the visions of these heads of departments who were given a free hand in selecting their respective staffs.

Clinical training and instruction to students were given through affiliate hospitals such as the North General Hospital, San Lazaro Hospital, Rizal Provincial Hospital, Children's Memorial Hospital, Malacañan Clinic, National Mental Hospital, and National Orthopedic Hospital.

In 1960, the Institute continued its medical excellence by branching to another health science by establishing the School of Medical Technology.

Setting up the Hospital 
In order to bring clinical training closer to the campus, groundbreaking of the University hospital commenced in the trapezoidal lot, north-east of the FEU campus. Designed by Felipe Mendoza in the International Style, its construction was estimated to be around ₱1.5 million. In October 1955, the FEU Hospital was completed and inaugurated. Headed by Dr. Ricardo Alfonso as Director, it would cater to the students of the IM, and later, the Institute of Nursing.

A new beginning 
In 1971, the Institute of Medicine embarked on a huge change. Together with the School of Medical Technology and the FEU Hospital, IM was re-constructed and made into a non-stock, non-profit educational foundation. Named after the university's founder, the Far Eastern University - Dr. Nicanor Reyes Medical Foundation (FEU-NRMF) was established.

With the installation of its Board of Trustees, chaired by Nicanor M. Reyes Jr., FEU-NRMF gained full independence of its operations and management from the main university. FEU-NRMF would then transfer its classes from the Science Building to two buildings adjacent to the FEU Hospital (one being the Girls' High Building) and renovated them to fit the needs for medical education.

In 1995, due to the lack of space and the need of expansion of the institution, the Board of Trustees approved the relocation of FEU-NRMF to a  lot in Fairview, Quezon City, with a new campus and hospital planned to be constructed.

FEU-NRMF Institute of Medicine 
Operated by the foundation, the FEU-NRMF Institute of Medicine continues its tradition and excellence, serving as a premier medical school in the country.

Academics 
Aside from its core Doctor of Medicine program, FEU-NRMF Institute of Medicine offers seven undergraduate programs in health sciences and the Science, Technology, Engineering and Mathematics track (STEM) in their Senior High School program. 
 School of Medicine
 School of Medical Laboratory Science
 School of Physical Therapy
 School of Nursing
 School of Respiratory Therapy
 School of Pharmacy
 School of Nutrition and Dietetics
 School of Radiologic Technology
Senior High School (STEM)

Accreditations and Recognitions 
The Philippine Accrediting Association of Schools, Colleges, and Universities (PAASCU) has accredited FEU-NRMF's Doctor of Medicine program a Level II status, while the Philippine Association of Colleges and Universities Commission on Accreditation (PACUCOA) accredited the Medical Technology and Nursing programs with Level III, and the Physical Therapy, a Level II.

In 2020, the Professional Regulations Commission (PRC) conferred upon FEU-NRMF the coveted recognition as the “Only Top Performing” school of medicine in the country for its performance in the 2020 physician's licensure examination. FEU-NRMF singly held this distinction for four years straight, since 2016. It posted a passing percentage of 80.53 in 2016, 88.20 in 2017, 89.29 in 2018, 97.96 in 2019 and 91.60 in 2020.

West Fairview Campus and Medical Complex
On December 22, 1996, FEU-NRMF Chairman Josephine S. Cojuangco-Reyes presided over the groundbreaking of the new P500 million modern medical school and hospital, assisted by now dean, Dr. Ricardo Alfonso, and Dr. Philip S. Chua. In 2001, the new facilities of the Medical Foundation were formally inaugurated. The ceremony was attended by President Corazon Aquino as guest of honor.

The FEU-NRMF Medical Center is the only Level 3 university hospital situated in District 5, Quezon City. It operates with 300 Hospital Beds, 10 Clinical Departments, 10 Accredited Residency Training Programs, and 6 Accredited Fellowship Programs. It is also accredited by PhilHealth as a Center of Excellence and the Philippine Council for Health Research and Development (PCHRD) has named the school as a Center of Excellence in Research.

In 2010, as part of its expansion efforts, the institution has been upgrading its training facilities, hence, the construction of the Josephine C. Reyes (JCR) Building has been completed, which presently houses the gymnasium, swimming pool, fitness gym, and classrooms.

In 2012, due to the needs for additional classrooms, doctor's clinics, and parking spaces, the groundbreaking for the Nicanor Reyes Tower was conducted. The 20-storey building was finished and inaugurated on August 1, 2016.

Medical Center – Clinical Services and Departments

Anesthesiology and Pain Clinic, Cardiovascular section, Child Health / PICU / NICU, Clinical Laboratory and Pathology, Community and Family Medicine, Diagnostic Imaging Center and Radiology, Emergency Medicine, Out-Patient, and Pay-Treatment Room, Gastroenterology, Internal Medicine, Nephrology, Neuroscience, Obstetrics and Gynecology, Oncology, Ophthalmology, Otolaryngology - Head and Neck Surgery, Physical Medicine and Rehabilitation, Pulmonary, Surgery and Ambulatory Service.

References

External links

Far Eastern University – Nicanor Reyes Medical Foundation Official Website
Far Eastern University – School of Medicine Alumni Foundation Official Website
 Far Eastern University-NRMF Medical Center Hospice & Palliative Care

Far Eastern University
Education in Quezon City
Graduate schools in the Philippines
Medical schools in the Philippines
Teaching hospitals in the Philippines
Hospitals in Metro Manila
Hospitals in Quezon City